Shirocco (foaled 10 April 2001) is a German Thoroughbred racehorse.  He was trained in his native Germany by Andreas Schütz up to the end of his three-year-old season before moving to French trainer André Fabre to race as a four and five year old.

Background
Shirocco was sired by Monsun, a German racehorse and leading sire. His dam was The Minstrel mare So Sedulous who won two races when trained in England by Geoff Wragg.  She was also the dam of Subiaco (winner of the Group 2 Gerling-Preis) and stakes winners Satchmo, Storm Trooper and September Storm.

Racing career
Shirocco is best known for winning the Breeders' Cup Turf in 2005. He also won the 2004 Deutsches Derby. Overall, he won 6 major group races in 5 countries.

Awards
In 2005 Shirocco was named German Horse of the Year.

Stud record
In October 2006 he was purchased by Darley Stud and retired to Dalham Hall Stud in Newmarket, England. In seven seasons on the Darley stallion roster he sired Brown Panther (winner of the Group 1 Irish St. Leger), Windstoss (winner of the Group 1 Deutsches Derby) and Group 2 winners Arrigo, Grand Vent and Wild Coco. Before the start of the 2014 breeding season he was sold to Glenview Stud in Fermoy, County Cork, Ireland to stand as a National Hunt stallion. In 2016 his daughter Annie Power won the Champion Hurdle at the Cheltenham Festival.

Pedigree

References

2001 racehorse births
Racehorses bred in Germany
Racehorses trained in Germany
Racehorses trained in France
German Thoroughbred Horse of the Year
Breeders' Cup Turf winners
Thoroughbred family 2-e